Vincent Joseph White (1885 – 14 December 1958) was an Irish politician and medical practitioner.

White was born in 1885, the son of Dr. Vincent White. His grandfather was also Dr. Vincent White. He obtained his medical degree from the Royal College of Surgeons in Ireland. 

He first stood for election as the Sinn Féin candidate for the Waterford City by-election in March 1918, where he was defeated by the Irish Parliamentary Party (IPP) candidate William Redmond, son of the deceased MP and IPP leader John Redmond. At the 1918 general election he again contested Waterford and was again beaten by Redmond. He was elected unopposed as a Sinn Féin Teachta Dála (TD) to the 2nd Dáil at the 1921 elections for the Waterford–Tipperary East constituency. He supported the Anglo-Irish Treaty and voted in favour of it.

He was re-elected as a pro-Treaty Sinn Féin TD at the 1922 general election but lost his seat at the 1923 general election. He was re-elected as a Cumann na nGaedheal TD for the Waterford constituency at the June 1927 and September 1927 general elections. He lost his seat at the 1932 general election. He served as Mayor of Waterford from 1920 to 1926.

References

1885 births
1958 deaths
Early Sinn Féin TDs
Cumann na nGaedheal TDs
Members of the 2nd Dáil
Members of the 3rd Dáil
Members of the 5th Dáil
Members of the 6th Dáil
Politicians from County Waterford
20th-century Irish medical doctors
People of the Irish Civil War (Pro-Treaty side)
Sinn Féin parliamentary candidates
Alumni of the Royal College of Surgeons in Ireland